Dans le silence, je sens rouler la terre is a 2010 documentary film.

Synopsis 
In 1939, the end of the Spanish Civil War forced thousands of men, women and children to flee Francoist Spain. The French administration in Algeria opened refugee camps to take them in. Seventy years later, a young Algerian investigates the past. Despite the absence of archives and files, the traces of these camps have survived the collective oblivion and still appear in current Algeria.

External links
 
  

2010 films
Creative Commons-licensed documentary films
Algerian documentary films
French documentary films
2010 documentary films
Documentary films about the Spanish Civil War
Documentary films about refugees
Documentary films about African politics
2010s French films